Mikhalyov is a Russian masculine surname, its feminine counterpart is Mikhalyova. It may refer to:

 Aleksey Mikhalyov (born 1983), Russian football player
 Aleksey Mikhalyov (1944–1994), Russian translator
 Andrei Mikhalev (born 1978), Belarusian ice hockey player
 Ilya Mikhalyov (born 1990), Ukrainian football player
 Sergey Mikhalyov (1947–2015), Russian ice hockey coach
 Vladimir Mikhalyov (born 1987), Russian football player

Russian-language surnames